Reverie is an American science fiction drama television series. The series was commissioned on May 12 and aired through August 8, 2018. The first season of 10 episodes premiered on May 30, 2018 on NBC.

On November 6, 2018, NBC canceled the series after one season.

Premise 
Former hostage negotiator Mara Kint, an expert on human behavior, takes a job saving people whose minds are lost in an advanced virtual-reality simulation, Reverie. In the process, Kint begins to work through a personal tragedy in her own past.

Cast

Main
Sarah Shahi as Mara Kint, an expert in human behavior and former hostage negotiator hired by Onira-Tech to intervene on behalf of patients trapped within Reverie. Having lost her sister and niece in a shooting, she also takes the opportunity to use Reverie as a means of dealing with the guilt she feels for failing to save them.  
Dennis Haysbert as Charlie Ventana, an ex-cop and Mara's former boss. As a senior security consultant and operations manager for Onira-Tech, he is responsible for involving her with Reverie.
Jessica Lu as Alexis Barrett, an introverted programmer and the founder of Onira-Tech, whose research forms the foundation of Reverie. She also programmed Dylan, the artificial intelligence that manages Onira-Tech's systems and is modeled after her deceased brother.
Sendhil Ramamurthy as Paul Hammond, the scientist and developer behind 2.0, the version of Reverie that Onira-Tech is currently preparing to sell to the public.
Kathryn Morris as Monica Shaw, a Defense Department official with an interest in the use of Reverie for government purposes, and an occasional ally to Charlie and Mara.

Recurring
Jon Fletcher as Oliver Hill, Alexis's former partner at Onira-Tech, who claims there is a systemic flaw affecting Reverie.
Madeleine McGraw as Brynn, Mara's niece, who was murdered by her unstable father. She appears as a hallucination caused by her aunt's use of Reverie.
Sam Jaeger as Dr. Chris Condera, a therapist and Mara's fiancé until she broke up with him in the aftermath of her family's murder.
 Gary Kraus as Leekly, a security guard at Onira- Tech, who secretly is working with Oliver Hill.

Production

Development 

 Production companies Universal Television and Amblin Television produced this series.

 Mickey Fisher was the creator and executive producer for this television series.
 Jaume Collet-Serra directed the first episode. 
 Other executive producers / producers consist of Steven Spielberg, Tom Szentgyorgyi, Brooklyn Weaver, Darryl Frank and Justin Falvey.
 Cinematography by Joseph E. Gallagher.
 Some of the CGI Artists / Animators behind this production were Delano Athias, Tyrone Evans Clark, and Michael Capton.

Episodes

Reception

Critical response
Reverie has received a score of 62% on Rotten Tomatoes based on 13 reviews, with an average rating of 6.9/10, and 42 on Metacritic, which uses a weighted score, based on 7 reviews.

Writing for Forbes, Merrill Barr was impressed at the "limitless potential" provided by the procedural format of a show he describes as a "high concept thriller" with "enough breadcrumbs laid out to entice the audience".  IndieWire's Hanh Nguyen compares the show favorably with the darker British virtual reality series Black Mirror: "The virtual reality setting is a blank canvas that invites play, and the procedural element of Mara regularly retrieving lost souls gives the series an optimistic and hopeful bent. There's plenty of fun here, but with enough pathos to add weight." Conversely, The Verges Adi Robertson, who also compares the show with Black Mirror, was left cold by what she perceived as the broadly optimistic tone: "Audiences have gotten familiar with this kind of cautionary yarn, where technology offers a lonely simulacrum of human contact. But Reveries pilot turns the idea toward optimism and earnest schmaltz—with extremely dull results." Shana Oneil, posting on /Film, was impressed by the premise, story, and acting, but also found the lack of hard science as a potential problem: "The ideas are certainly there, along with the creepy science tech (the actual Reverie connection module squicked me out), but good science fiction needs truth to anchor it."

Ratings 
Reverie was the lowest-rated series of the NBC 2018 summer lineup, averaging just over 2 million viewers per episode.

References

External links

2010s American drama television series
2010s American science fiction television series
2018 American television series debuts
2018 American television series endings
American thriller television series
English-language television shows
NBC original programming
Serial drama television series
Television shows about virtual reality
Television series by Amblin Entertainment
Television series by Universal Television